Zeno Marius Bundea (born 4 October 1977) is a Romanian football coach and a former player who played mainly as a midfielder. He is the manager of Slovan Valea Cerului

Bundea started his career at Bihor Oradea, the main football club from his hometown and then played for important teams as: Rapid București, Zenit St. Petersburg, FC U Craiova, Naţional București or Universitatea Cluj. In the late years of his career Bundea came back to Oradea and played for Luceafărul Oradea in the Liga II, then for Liga IV clubs near the city, such as FC Hidişelu de Sus or Crișul Sântandrei. In 2016, Bundea was for a short period the sporting director of Luceafărul Oradea and in February 2017 he opened his own football academy, Zenit Oradea, named in honor of the most important club in his career, Zenit St. Petersburg.

Honours
Rapid București
 Romanian Championship: 1998–99
 Cupa României: 1998
FC Hidişelu de Sus
 Liga IV-Bihor County: 2015–16

References

External links
 
 
 
 Zeno Bundea at frf-ajf.ro

1977 births
Living people
Sportspeople from Oradea
Romanian footballers
Romania international footballers
Association football midfielders
Association football defenders
Liga I players
Liga II players
FC Bihor Oradea players
FC Rapid București players
FCM Bacău players
FC U Craiova 1948 players
FC Progresul București players
FC Universitatea Cluj players
CS ACU Arad players
CS Luceafărul Oradea players
Russian Premier League players
FC Zenit Saint Petersburg players
2. Bundesliga players
Kickers Offenbach players
SV Waldhof Mannheim players
Israeli Premier League players
Maccabi Netanya F.C. players
Romanian expatriate footballers
Romanian expatriate sportspeople in Germany
Expatriate footballers in Germany
Romanian expatriate sportspeople in Israel
Expatriate footballers in Israel
Romanian expatriate sportspeople in Russia
Expatriate footballers in Russia
Romanian football managers